The Paratech P70 is a Swiss single-place paraglider that was designed by Uwe Bernholz and produced by Paratech of Appenzell. It was introduced in 2000, but is now out of production.

Design and development
The aircraft was designed as an advanced and competition glider.

Operational history
Reviewer Noel Bertrand noted in a 2003 review that the P70 was "held in high regard by flyers of performance machines."

Variants
P70M
Mid-sized model for medium-weight pilots. The glider model is DHV 2-3 certified.
P70L
Large-sized model for heavier pilots. The glider model is DHV 2GH certified.

Specifications (P70M)

References

P70
Paragliders
Vehicles introduced in 2000